Zilla Parishad High School (ZPHS) is a type of state-run secondary school in India. These schools are established, supervised, and funded by the District Councils of India (locally known as Zilla Parishad, district level local authorities of states). ZP High Schools provide education for students from grades 6-10 of the Secondary School Certificate.

Background 
Zilla Parishad Schools are generally established in rural areas while other government and private high schools cater to urban areas.

Administration 
Parishad Educational Officer is responsible for preparing budget for the school and disbursing salaries for Zilla Parishad teachers. Director of School Education releases funds for this purpose.

References

See also
 Mandal Parishad Primary School
 Sarva Shiksha Abhiyan

Education in India
School types